Robert Lindsay-Watson (4 October 1886 – 26 January 1956) was a Scotland international rugby union player and an Olympic athlete.

Athletics career
He was schooled at St. Mary's School, Melrose.  The Southern Reporter of 23 July 1908 said of Lindsay-Watson:
Robert Lindsay Watson might said to be St. Mary's representative in the Olympic Games in London, as he is one of the team of Scottish Athletes.

He competed in the men's hammer throw at the 1908 Summer Olympics.

Rugby Union career
He played for South of Scotland District in their match against North of Scotland District on 9 December 1911.

He was capped by Scotland once, in 1909.

Administrative career
He became President of the Hawick club when his playing days ended.

Military career

He joined the 10th Gordon Highlanders and fought in the First World War. The Edinburgh Evening News reported a number of Borders Rugby players either killed or injured on 30 September 1915:
LIEUT. R. H. LINDSAY WATSON.Lieut. Robert H. Lindsay Watson, of the 10th Gordon Highlanders, son of T. Lindsay Watson, tweed manufacturer, Hawick, has been wounded action in Flanders. He is the well known Rugby footballer.

References

External links
 

1886 births
1956 deaths
People educated at St. Mary's School, Melrose
Athletes (track and field) at the 1908 Summer Olympics
British male hammer throwers
Hawick RFC players
Olympic athletes of Great Britain
Rugby union players from Hawick
Scotland international rugby union players
Scottish rugby union players
South of Scotland District (rugby union) players
Rugby union wings